Delamarre is a surname. Notable people with the surname include:

Camille Delamarre (born 1979), French film editor and director
Hervé Delamarre (born 1967), French slalom canoeist
Louis-Charles-Auguste Delamarre de Lamellerie (1771–1840), French Navy officer and captain
Raymond Delamarre (1890–1986), French sculptor and medalist
Xavier Delamarre (born 1954),  French linguist, lexicographer and diplomat

See also 
Delamare